Joseph Chua Cua (born October 16, 1962) is a Filipino politician from the province of Catanduanes, Philippines. He currently serves as a Governor of Catanduanes. He was first elected as Governor of the province in 2007 and he was re-elected in the 2010, 2016, and 2019 elections.

References

External links
Province of Catanduanes Official Website

Living people
Governors of Catanduanes
1962 births
United Nationalist Alliance politicians